Li Xi may refer to:

 Li Xi (Tang dynasty) (李谿; died 895), Tang dynasty chancellor
 Li Xi, Prince of Yue (李係; died 762), son of Emperor Suzong of Tang
 Li Xi (politician) (李希; born 1956), Secretary of the Central Commission for Discipline Inspection of the Chinese Communist Party, Communist party chief of Guangdong province
 Li Xi (politician, born 1962) (李喜), former Executive Vice-Mayor of Kunming
 Lì xì, the Vietnamese term for red envelopes